

List by Food and Agriculture Organization

List by Japan's Ministry of Agriculture, Forestry and Fisheries

This is a 2010 list of major countries by food self-sufficiency rates on a calorie supply basis.

See also

References

Agricultural production
Lists of countries by production
Economy-related lists of superlatives
Food self-sufficiency rate, Countries
Self-sustainability